The 1988 Derby City Council election took place on 5 May 1988 to elect members of Derby City Council in England. Local elections were held in the United Kingdom in 1988. This was on the same day as other local elections. 15 of the council's 44 seats were up for election. The Conservatives gained control of the council from the Labour Party.

Overall results

|-
| colspan=2 style="text-align: right; margin-right: 1em" | Total
| style="text-align: right;" | 15
| colspan=5 |
| style="text-align: right;" | 56,856
| style="text-align: right;" |

Ward results

Abbey

Allestree

Alvaston

Babington

Blagreaves

Boulton

Breadsall

Chaddesden

Chellaston

Darley

Derwent

Kingsway

Litchurch

Spondon

References

1988 English local elections
May 1988 events in the United Kingdom
1988
1980s in Derbyshire